The Broadway station is a local station on the BMT Astoria Line of the New York City Subway. It is located above 31st Street at Broadway in Astoria, Queens. The station is served by the N train at all times, as well as by the W train on weekdays.

History 
This station opened on February 1, 1917, along with the rest of the Astoria Line, which was originally part of the IRT, as a spur off the IRT Queensboro Line, which is now the IRT Flushing Line. Trains ran between Grand Central and Astoria. On July 23, 1917, the Queensboro Bridge spur of the elevated IRT Second Avenue Line opened. At that time, all elevated trains to Queensboro Plaza used the Astoria Line while all subway trains used the IRT Flushing Line, though this was later changed with trains alternating between branches. This station started to be served by BMT shuttles using elevated cars on April 8, 1923.

The city government took over the BMT's operations on June 1, 1940, and the IRT's operations on June 12, 1940. On October 17, 1949, the Astoria Line became BMT-only as the tracks at Queensboro Plaza were consolidated and the platforms on the Astoria Line were shaved back to allow BMT trains to operate on it. Service was initially provided by the Brighton Local (BMT 1) and the Broadway–Fourth Avenue Local (BMT 2) at all times.

Station renovations 

The project cost $863,000. Signals on the line had to be modified to take the platform extensions into account.

Under the 2015–2019 MTA Capital Plan, the station underwent a complete overhaul as part of the Enhanced Station Initiative and was entirely closed for several months. Updates included cellular service, Wi-Fi, USB charging stations, interactive service advisories and maps. The award for Package 2 of the renovations, which covered renovations at the 30th Avenue, Broadway, 36th Avenue, and 39th Avenue stations, was awarded on April 14, 2017, to Skanska USA. The Broadway and 39th Avenue stations were closed entirely on July 2, 2018, and reopened on January 24, 2019, slightly earlier than expected. A previously demolished entrance to the northeast corner of Broadway and 31st Street was added once again to improve access.

In 2019, the MTA announced that this station would become ADA-accessible as part of the agency's 2020–2024 Capital Program.

Station layout

This station has two side platforms and three tracks. The center track is not used in revenue service, but it had been used regularly as recently as 2002. The station contains wooden canopies with transite and wooden mezzanines, but only the southbound platform has windscreens. The station has a narrow crossover in its mezzanine that allows for passengers to change their direction of travel at the station.

Exits
The mezzanine is configured like 30th Avenue. Outside of fare control, street stairs descend to all corners of Broadway and 31st Street. An exit-only stair from the northbound platform descends to the east side of 31st Street between Broadway and 34th Avenue.

References

External links 
 
 
 Station Reporter — N Train
 Broadway entrance from Google Maps Street View
 Platforms from Google Maps Street View

1917 establishments in New York City
Astoria, Queens
BMT Astoria Line stations
New York City Subway stations in Queens, New York
Railway stations in the United States opened in 1917